Trevor Cilia (born 2 January 1983 in Pietà, Malta) is a professional footballer currently playing for Għargħur, where he plays as a midfielder.

Trevor Cilia was part of the 2009–2010 team for Birkirkara, where Birkirkara were crowned champions of the Maltese Premier League for their third time ever in the club's history.

Playing career
Trevor is a Floriana Product whose debut with the 'Greens' was in the Premier League of 2000 at the age of 17. Trevor spent eight successful years with the 'Greens' and, with 135 appearances managed to score 21 goals.

In the Summer Transfer Market of 2008, Trevor was the main target of several main clubs including Birkirkara and it was the 'Stripes' who won Trevor's signature for two years. The 2008–2009 season was not the best for Trevor, as due to his position of retire role of a right back, Trevor could not show off his skills in his favoured position. Although not playing in his favorite position, Trevor still managed to score two goals.

Season 2009–2010 was a special one for Cilia as he was one of the most dangerous strikers of the season. With his daring runs on the wing, Trevor established himself as an important player in the squad. During this season, besides making a good number of assists, he has managed to rank as the 3rd best club scorer with 13 goals. Cilia won his first ever Premier League title in 2010 when, on 5 May he had the joy of lifting the cup for the first time.

In June 2010, 'il-Bazzaz' as he is known among his teammates and numerous fans, extended his stay with Birkirkara by another three years and was the first player to sign the new contract meaning that Trevor shall be wearing the yellow and red shirt, at least until the end of 2012–2013 season.

In 2015, Cilia was signed by Hamrun Spartans F.C.

On 14 September 2019 Għargħur announced, that Cilia had joined the club.

References

External links
 Trevor Cilia at MaltaFootball.com
 
 

Living people
1983 births
Maltese footballers
Floriana F.C. players
Birkirkara F.C. players
Ħamrun Spartans F.C. players
Sliema Wanderers F.C. players
Marsaxlokk F.C. players
Luqa St. Andrew's F.C. players
Maltese Premier League players
People from Pietà, Malta
Association football wingers
Malta under-21 international footballers
Malta international footballers